The mandibular symphysis divides below and encloses a triangular eminence, the mental protuberance, the base of which is depressed in the center but raised on either side to form the mental tubercle. The two mental tubercles along with the medial mental protuberance are collectively called the mental trigone.

References

External links
 Diagram at face-and-emotion.com (Item #1)

Bones of the head and neck